Plungington is a district of Preston, Lancashire, England, to the northwest of the city centre. It is now largely occupied by students attending the University of Central Lancashire. Historically, it was an area of working-class terraced housing dating from the late 1880s.

Plungington Road, which changes its name beyond Aqueduct Street to Adelphi Street, also crosses the main Preston-Blackpool road, the A5085.

Geography of Preston